Tony Castillo (born January 3, 1972) better known by his stage name Gorilla Tek is an American record producer and composer. He is well known throughout South Florida as the brainchild of the production company known as Drummajorz. His success dates back to "Iconz" from their international smash hit entitled "Get Fucked Up". He has been managed by longtime business partner JC "Fentz" Louis, CEO of Iconz Worldwide, a music and film company in South Florida, also co-founder of Drum Majorz Inc. Tek has scored on various films such as Bloodline, released through Codeblack/Universal, and The Next Hit, starring Fredro Starr, Rick Ross and Lark Vorhies, released through SJW Films/Lionsgate.

He helped form Miami based The Committee in 1985 with 4 co-founders Carl Bosse, Trek, Fentz, and Chapter, originally working with DJ Uncle Al & Uncle Luke. In 1999, the Committee expanded to artist management as Iconz Music Group. From 1998 to 2002 he was a part of a duo with fellow producer Trek. Their collaborations included work for Slip-n-Side Records artists; Trick Daddy, J-Shin, and Trina. Through management of the Opa-Locka based rap group the Iconz, their lead single "Get Fucked Up" which was released in 2000 was able to reach the Billboard Hot 100 peaking at #93.

Production discography

2000s
Iconz- Street Money Album (Singles “Get Fucked Up and the Remix featuring Lil' Kim) (2000)
Ludacris featuring DTP – Growing Pains (remix) (2002)
Iconz- Ya Lookin At Em Album (2003)
8 Ball & MJG – Tryin’ Ta Get At You featuring 112 (2004)
Pitbull – Miami Shit (2006)
8 Ball & MJG-  Runnin’ out of Bud featuring Too Short (2007)
Ball Greezy – Shone (2007)
Ball Greezy- I'm the Sh*t Featuring Brisco and Ace Hood (2008)
 Grind Mode- She's So Fly (I'm So High) (2008)
Flo Rida – Freaky Deaky (2008)
Trick Daddy- Tonight featuring Trina and Jaheim
Trick Daddy- Menage et trios Featuring Field Mob
Trick Daddy- Children Hold On
Trick Daddy- Bout Mine
Trick Daddy- Rags to Riches
Trick Daddy- Pull Over (Remix)
Trick Daddy- Have My Cheese
Trick Daddy- Thug For Life
Trick Daddy- Ho But can't help It
Trick Daddy- I'll Be Your Player (Remix)
Trick Daddy- Goin’ Down Like That
Pretty Ricky- Personal Trainer
Jacki-O – Nookie Real Good
Jacki-O – Champion
Field Mob – Haters featuring Trick Daddy
Field Mob- Ready Rock
Trina- Ball Wit’ Me
Jagged Edge When The Bed Shakes*
Trina- Material Girl
Trina- Hot Commodity Featuring Rick Ross
Grandaddy Souf – I Told Ya from the Malibu's Most Wanted Soundtrack
Sharissa- Any Other Night (Remix) Featuring Scarface
Luke- Worldwide
Luke- Lay Your Ass Down Featuring Underground
Luke- Party Don't Stop Featuring Kid Capri
Damian Marley – Where is the Love (Remix) Featuring Eve
The Diplomats – Crunk Music
Bloodline Original Soundtrack
Tay Dizm- Point em ou
Mook & Fair- Sidekick Featuring Ray J
Maino- Unstoppable
 Welcome Back Fat Boy Rhymer "Wham"
 J Shin "You did it I did it" & "Welcome to the M.I.A" 
 Juice Yung N Giant "Where I came from" "All I want"
 The Regulaz "OTL"
 Maino - Day After Tomorrow Album
 BoB - Plain Jane

2010s
 Donny Arcade - Anunnaki (2016)
 Donny Arcade - 3600 (2016)
 Donny Arcade - Welcome Back Home featuring Anjolique (2016)

References

External links 
 

Living people
American hip hop record producers
1972 births